Robert Samuel Langer may refer to:

 Rob Langer (born 1948), Australian cricketer
 Robert S. Langer (born 1948), American chemical engineer and scientist